Pandorum is an adventure game for the iPhone and iPod Touch based on Starz Media's science fiction horror film of the same name, Pandorum. The game was developed by Artificial Life, Inc. and launched on September 15, 2009 for $3.99 on Apple's App Store just prior to the movie's debut in theaters in the United States on September 25, 2009.

Gameplay 
In Pandorum, players control the game's main character, Corporal Bower, on his quest to explore different parts of the spaceship Elysium in a 360-degree 3D view. The game uses dual stick controls to move and look around. Buttons on the screen allow players to attack and to switch weapons as well as to access various menus.

The game consists of 5 missions in which players must solve puzzles and defeat various monsters in order to advance through the game. Weapons, healing items and other bonus items are scattered throughout the spaceship and must be retrieved during Corporal Bower's journey. Included in the overall game is a mini-game puzzle that involves connecting electrical circuits by creating the correct path which when solved will provide the charge to unlock certain doors.

Throughout the game, up to 10 medals are awarded based on performance during missions. Upgrade packages are also available in the game for weapon upgrades, unlimited ammo and a more protective suit for Corporal Bower.

Plot 
The goal of the game is to escape the spaceship and reveal its secrets in order to save the human race. The story is told through cutscenes as well as journal entries that can be found in the ship.

Included in the game 
As the official game for the film Pandorum, the movie trailer and cutscenes are available in the game as well as links for purchasing tickets (available in the US for a limited time only).

Free Version Available 
A lite version of the game launched on September 15, 2009, in Apple's App Store allowing players to play the first mission for free.

iOS 3.0 Features 
The game contains an in-app purchase that contains more weapons, a stronger suit for Corporal Bower, unlimited ammo, and gives players the ability to share the upgrade features and game progress with other players via Bluetooth.

Scores 
Players can compete with other friends via Facebook Connect and record their best times on a global leaderboard.

Reviews

 Tracy Erickson (Sept 26 2009) Pandorum (iPhone)
 Roger Moore (Sept 27 2009) Pandorum
 Daniel (Sept 17 2009) Pandorum Review: Shooting Yourself in the Foot
 Kirk Hiner (Oct 28 2009) Appletell Reviews Pandorum for iPhone and iPod Touch 
 Colin Boyd (Sept 18 2009) New ‘Pandorum’ Game for iPhone and iPod Touch

References

External links 
Artificial Life, Inc
Pandorum official movie site

2009 video games
Adventure games
IOS games
IOS-only games
Video games based on films
Video games developed in the United States
Single-player video games